The Polish Pairs Speedway Championship (Polish: Mistrzostwa Polski Par Klubowych, MPPK) is an annual speedway event held each year in different Polish clubs organized by the Polish Motor Union (PZM) since 1974.

The participating teams are drawn into three groups; each staging a pairs competition. The top two teams in each group qualify for the Final. A host team chosen by the GKSŻ is seeded directly to the Final. The team winning the Final is awarded a gold medal and declared Polish Pairs Champions. Teams finishing second and third are awarded silver and bronze medals respectively.

Previous winners

Rules
Team composition
The 6 (or 7) competing teams shall each consist of 3 riders: 2 riders having programmed riders and the third rider being a substitute, as follows:

The substitute rider may take the place of any programmed rider, at any time, within the maximum number of permitted heats (5 when is 6 pairs and 6 when is 7 pairs) when decided by the Team Manager.

Race format

References

 
Pairs